An embarrassment of riches is an idiom that means an overabundance of something, or too much of a good thing, that originated in 1738 as John Ozell's translation of a French play, L'Embarras des richesses (1726), by Léonor Jean Christine Soulas d'Allainval.

Example: "All four of them have their own cars but there's no room in the driveway—an embarrassment of riches".

The idiom has also inspired other works and been included in their titles. This includes: The Embarrassment of Riches (1906), a play by Louis K. Anspacher, and a 1918 drama film of the same name based on the Anspacher play;
a 2006 music album of this name by Elephant Micah; the history book The Embarrassment of Riches: An Interpretation of Dutch Culture in the Golden Age by Simon Schama; and An Embarrassment of Riches, a 2000 novel written by Filipino author Charlson Ong.

References 

Idioms
English phrases